Goločelo is a village in Serbia. It is situated in the Koceljeva municipality, in the Mačva District of Central Serbia. The village had a Serb ethnic majority and a population of 584 in 2002.

Historical population

1948: 1,114
1953: 1,134
1961: 1,071
1971: 945
1981: 852
1991: 705
2002: 584

References

See also
List of places in Serbia

Populated places in Mačva District